The third and final season of the American cable television series Legion is based on the Marvel Comics character David Haller / Legion, a mutant diagnosed with schizophrenia at a young age. The season is produced by FX Productions in association with Marvel Television. Noah Hawley serves as showrunner.

Dan Stevens stars as Haller, with Rachel Keller, Aubrey Plaza, Bill Irwin, Navid Negahban, Jeremie Harris, Amber Midthunder and Hamish Linklater also returning from previous seasons to star. They are joined by newcomer Lauren Tsai. A third season of Legion was ordered by FX in June 2018, and FX later confirmed it would be the final season in February 2019.

The season premiered on FX on June 24, 2019, and consists of eight episodes.

Episodes

Cast and characters

Main
 Dan Stevens as David Haller / Legion
 Rachel Keller as Sydney "Syd" Barrett
 Aubrey Plaza as Lenny Busker
 Bill Irwin as Cary Loudermilk
 Navid Negahban as Amahl Farouk / Shadow King
 Jeremie Harris as Ptonomy Wallace
 Amber Midthunder as Kerry Loudermilk
 Lauren Tsai as Jia-yi / Switch
 Hamish Linklater as Clark Debussy

Special guest stars
 Jean Smart as Melanie Bird
 Jemaine Clement as Oliver Bird

Recurring
 Harry Lloyd as Charles Xavier / Professor X
 Stephanie Corneliussen as Gabrielle Xavier

Notable guest stars
 Jason Mantzoukas as Jerome / Wolf

Production

Development
In June 2018, the series was renewed for a third season. In February 2019, it was announced that the third season would premiere in June 2019, and will serve as the final season of the series. Hawley's plan had always been for three seasons, he stated, "I think endings are what give stories meaning. I always thought about this as a complete story, and it felt like three acts of a story." He continued:

The season consists of eight episodes.

Casting
Returning from previous seasons to star are Dan Stevens as David Haller, Rachel Keller as Sydney "Syd" Barrett, Aubrey Plaza as Lenny Busker, Bill Irwin as Cary Loudermilk, Navid Negahban as Amahl Farouk / Shadow King, Jeremie Harris as Ptonomy Wallace, Amber Midthunder as Kerry Loudermilk, and Hamish Linklater as Clark Debussy. In January 2019, Lauren Tsai was cast as Switch, "a young mutant whose secret ability serves as the key to executing David Haller's plan". She is loosely based on the Marvel Comics character of the same name who was male. In February, it was announced that the characters Gabrielle Haller and Professor X would appear played by Stephanie Corneliussen and Harry Lloyd, respectively. Jean Smart and Jemaine Clement also return in special guest roles as Melanie and Oliver Bird in "Chapter 25".

Design
Reinforced by the idea of David leading a cult, inspirations for set design as well as clothing were drawn from psychedelic visuals from the 1960s and 70s, all while integrating with modern-day elements to avoid dating the series. 

Costume designer Robert Blackman continued the theme of mixing fashion from different decades, with prominent features from psychedelic 60s/70s and modern-day fashion. Each character's outfits were updated, with the color palette for each character changed. As the leader of his group, Haller's style resembles that of a guru, particularly his orange tunic. As the second-line leader of the girl group, Busker wears more feminine, violet/blue articles of clothing. Barrett wears predominantly black, drawing stylistic inspirations from Marianne Faithfull. Cary and Kerry Loudermilk both maintain the color palette, although Cary wears more neutral colors while Kerry wears navy and brown. As Wallace has now become a vehicle for the Mainframe, Wallace's clothing has become more muted in color. Other changes include Debussy wearing aubergine suits and Farouk wearing three-piece suits of various neutral colors. With timeless visuals enabled more so by introduction of new character Switch, her timeless style is drawn from mixing Harajuku fashion with pop elements.

New production designer Marco Niro, who worked on Mayans M.C., drew inspirations from his studies and travels to envision new set designs for the show. Hawley and Niro discussed the integration of different time periods and locations as well as how the Enlightenment House does not need to obey the laws of physics, as seen by the blue energy that flows through the whole house. When designing the Division 3 headquarters, Hawley only told Niro he needed a flying fortress; Niro designed an airship for Division 3, with mythological symbols from cultures and references to books and art from his journeys added to the airship set. To create the hall of time in which Switch travels, an elegant shape was applied to the hallway, to which a forced perspective is done to invoke a sense of endlessly traveling forwards or backwards in time.

Music
Composer Jeff Russo returned to compose for the third season. A soundtrack album for the season featuring Russo's score and reimagined covers was released digitally on December 18, 2020. All music by Jeff Russo, except where noted:

Release

Broadcast
The season began airing on FX on June 24, 2019, and consists of eight episodes.

Reception

Critical response
The review aggregator website Rotten Tomatoes reported a 93% approval rating for the third season, with an average rating of 7.90 out of 10 based on 71 reviews. The website's critical consensus reads, "In its final season, Legion remains a singular piece of visually arresting, mind-bending television that never fails to surprise." Metacritic, which uses a weighted average, assigned a score of 72 out of 100 based on six critics, indicating "generally favorable reviews".

David Bianculli of NPR praised the series and wrote, "Legion uses visuals, editing, music and sound better than almost any series on television. And I don't just mean any series now — I mean ever. I've seen the first half of this final season, and that's even more true than before." Ben Travers of IndieWire wrote a generally positive review and gave it a "B" grade, writing, "Hawley's series remains ambitious to the end, accepting the flaws that come with such big dreams and daring to keep dreaming bigger. The result is imperfect, but mesmerizing in just enough scenes to keep you coming back for more. Those short stories are adding up to something, and even if Legion isn't the sum of its parts, some of those parts are spectacular on their own."

Ratings

References

External links
 
 

2019 American television seasons
03